The Unyeada Kingdom, sometimes referred to as "Ayanda" a corrupted version of Unyeada,  is literally interpreted as (Unye  Eda) "prowess of Edabiri". Unyeada is an ancient riverine settlement (Kingdom) located in western part of Obolo Land, administratively in Andoni Local Government Area of Rivers State, Nigeria.  Situated in the south of Ogoni tribe and Kingdom of Bonny to the west. Originally, Unyeada territory stretches from Iburubu Sea near the mouth of Andoni River to Okwan Obbu or Imo River.

Geography 
The Kingdom of Unyeada is the populated among Obolo (Andoni) cluster. In the Pre-colonial era, Unyeada Kingdom spanned from the east of Bonny Island to Ikot-Abasi and Eastern Obolo to the west and bounded by Ogoni people to the north and to the south is the Andoni Island. The natural boundaries of Unyeada Kingdom starts from the Iburubu Sea (mouth of Andoni River) and ends at Imo River covering a total area of approximately 146km2.   

The topography is generally a low lying mangroves swamp with occasional islands among the network of brackish creeks. These area have an untapped ecotourism potential and enormous oil and gas reserves. Demographically, Unyeada people (as recorded in the 1963  Nigerian population census) had a population growth figure of 25,442. The number doesn't include the population of migrant fishermen.The projected figures for 1999 Population Census in Nigeria recorded  a total of 80,651 for Unyeada Kingdom. Similarly, using Regression Analysis and the assumption of 2.5 percent annual growth rate, the population of Unyeada Kingdom was estimated at about 93,053 by 2002.   

Andoni after Nigerian Independence was divided into three Clans (Unyeada, Ngo and Okorotte) in the Eastern Region, Nigeria.    

Unyeada Town was the administrative headquarters of Unyeada Clan which comprises Asarama, Egendem and Dema communities. Presently, There are many communities that made up Unyeada Kingdom, prominent towns include, Isiodum, Egbomu, Dema, Ibot-irem, Samanga  and Ajakajak. It's  administratively divided into two namely: Unyeada District and Isi-Okwan District.

History

Origin and Migration 

Oral tradition in Unyeada suggests that the ancestors of Unyeada led by the progenitor  Edabiri, a warrior migrated through the Old Benin Empire and Ijaw contraption from Egypt to settled in a place near the present Itsekiri and later to the Ayama (Nyamkpo) around 12th century BC. They are believed to be among the first settlers in the Eastern Delta, King Edabiri and his men discovered upper Andoni River and settled at a place called Ebon-Isebeke and later to Ebon-Akpon, (the site of Old Unyeada).

Another account claimed the migration took them along with other Obolo leaders, Ede , Asa, Alama, Efop, and Abah through to Urombi (Ramby) in the coastal contraption of the present Nigeria-Cameroon border, where they were faced with economic hardship as a result of war with the Bantu peoples before receding westward to Eastern Delta where they are today. The later is widely acceptable by major historical works on Obolo people. The Unyeada people speak Obolo language classified as Cross River language, the attrition of their original Ijaw language alluded to this fact. 

.

Lineages in Unyeada Kingdom 

These are four ancestral lineages that laid the foundation of Unyeada Kingdom, each were led by allies of King Edabiri of Old Unyeada.

 Egwe Eda (Forerunner of Ibirinya Otuo/Ogbolakon ), the royal lineage.

 Egwe Akpah (The precursor of Ibirinya Oyetile lineage)

 Egwe Ibok (Now called Ibirinya Otuibok) 

 Egwe Osiki ( Later called Ibirinya Etekan) 
 Egwe Ogbolodom Eyoka ( The precursor of Ibirinya Iyoba) This lineage is the latest to arrive, available records show that they arrived at Unyeada in 1860

Old Unyeada (Ayanda)

The name Old Unyeada connotes power and wealth, it was the cradle of Obolo nation in the Pre-colonial Eastern Delta. Many antiques from the site of Old Unyeada (Ebon-Akpon) are similar to the Obolo sacred item collected from the alter of the Obolo National god called Yok-Obolo at Agwut-Obolo during the 1904  British Punitive Expedition Against Obolo people. Unyeada was a notable contemporary to Eastern Delta's city-states especially the Kingdom of Bonny.

Recorded evidence shows that Old Unyeada featured prominently in the Trans-Atlantic trade. Owing to its location on the estuaries of  Andoni   River and Imo River, this is the access point to major hinterland markets hence Old Unyeada possess a significant controls to the hinterland market. Adadonye Fombo, in his  historiography describes Unyeada as "the most prosperous" of Andoni settlements during the pre-colonial era. Thus, Old Unyeada was by its strategic location on the routes of trade and also by historical precedents, equipped to provide the next phase of Andoni leadership.

Reign of King Otuo Ogbolakon

According to historical evidence collected by Silas Eneyo in his work, King Otuo Ogbalakon and the Leadership of Pre-colonial Obolo(Andoni)", King Otuo Ogbolakon of Unyeada was born at Old Unyeada in Egwe Eda (lineage of Eda) Eda in 1770. He was the Blue Blood to royalty of the Old Unyeada. His mother, Princess Ariaunwa, who, according to many writers, have over the rulership of the Kingdom from her father, King Ikana probably as a regent  married to Prince Ogbolakon of Alabie and begat Otuo. 

King Otuo Ogbalakon descended from King Edabiri a line of kings of Old Unyeada. Among them were Eda or Edabiri (probably Edabiri who founded Ebon-Akpon Old Unyeada).

King Edabiri Dynasty

 King Adaebi 

 King Okwan

 King Inyajo

 King Okpok

 King Ikana

 Queen Ariauwan

The young King Otuo Ogbalakon inherented a well-organized mornachy and was trained in the mastery of warfare of Old Unyeada. The King or Okaan-Ama is head of all the heads of lineages (Ibirinya). Each of the lineages possesses a number of war-canoe Houses or Otoko. Though, King Otuo Ogbolakon ascended the throne at a tender age but he was able to reorganized some traditional institutions and safeguards such as the Ofiokpo cult and emen Ogbologbo in Old Unyeada.

He was faced with significant internal and external challenges. Internally, the regency of his mother was negatively influenced by the ambitions of leaders of some of the lineages of the Old Unyeada during the Interregnum. The leaders of Ibirinya Otiko were already challenging the supremacy of the royal cult of Ofiokpo with their own cult of Agriba. Agriba, was a war deity of Bonny ancestry said to have captured from the Ibani tribe by the Otibok War canoe during the reign of Ikana. Old Unyeada oral evidence proved that King Otuo Ogbalakon eventually tested his royal power of Eda Dynasty. Agriba was defeated and the  political leaders of Otibok withdrawn their unfortunate ambitions.

The historic trend during the reign of King  Otuo Ogbolakon coincided with the period of transition from the  Slave Trade to the trade in palm-oil, the quest to control the trade was a major factor that breeds competition and Belligerent among different Kingdoms in the Eastern Niger Delta. The Kingdom of Bonny was at this time the commercial and political centre of the Niger Delta and maintained the lead in the new trade. The primary concern of King Otuo Ogbolakon appears to the consolidation of Andoni participation in the trade. He presented an affordable trading access and established his presence in the Ogoni hinterland markets of Ewe Ekoro, Ewe Atat (Du Nyere) and Ewe Isen. He also traded with the Ndoki people.

Bonny-Andoni War (1839-1846)

Different writers on this economic war all agreed that it lasted for seven year, Silas Eneyo did extensively on the periods of interval between the writers " E. M. T. Epelle, an Opobo historian, gives the period as 1836 to 1843. Dr. N. C Ejituwu places it between 1839 and 1846. Professor Kenneth Dike specifically refers to 1846 the date of famous Bonny - Andoni War". The war was fuelled by agitations to control the emerging palm-oil trade. King Otuo Ogbalakon led the famous trade blockage which resulted in seven years economic war in the Eastern Delta. The effect this war was recorded to affected British palm-oil trading interest in the Niger Delta as Marchant at Liverpool recorded low produce export from Bonny port.

New Unyeada      

Following the seven years war between the Unyeada (Andoni) and the Kingdom of Bonny, King Otuo Ogbalakon relocated the Unyeada which was at that time the Seat of power of Obolo people. He moved across to Iborong-Akama Island and founded the New Unyeada in 1827. He introduced many martial strategies to his territory. It was observed that the New Unyeada Town was fortified with seven row of hard wood stockade capable of preventing cannon shot from the enemy war canoes. King Otuo Ogbolakon died in 1849 and his descendants who have ruled as King "Okaan - Ama", are as follows:

King Otuo Ogbolakon Dynasty

 King Ogbilikana Eyewa Otuo II 
 King Otuile Otuo III                    

 King Uko Otuo IV                        
 King Ikwuruyok Otuo V             
 King Ekon Otuo  VI                    
 King Gwenden Otuo VII             
 King Fredrick Otuo VIII             
 King Israel Uzamaedeng Otuo IX         

 The present Okaan-Ama, His Eminence, King (Dr.) I. U. Otuo IX JP Okaan-Ama and Paramount Ruler of ancient Unyeada  Kingdom was crowned on the 14th February 1977. He was gazetted as 2nd Class King and Paramount ruler of Unyeada Kingdom and a member of the Rivers State Traditional Rulers Council by the former Governor of Rivers State, His Excellency, Rt. Honourable Rotimi Amaechi.

Language 
Unyeada people speak Obolo language. Though lexicography of Unyeada Obolo slightly varies from that of the Ngo and Eastern Obolo but they are one language and easily understood or spoken by all.  

 Obolo (Unyeada) numeric counting 

Number from Zero to Ten  

In the pre-colonial era, the Unyeada (Obolo) people used the Nsibidi signs and symbols to communicate with one another.

Rulership

Unyeada fishing festival

Unyeada Fishing Festival 

Unyeada Fishing Festival - Ijok-Irin is an annual cultural fishing festival celebrated by the Obolo people of Unyeada Kingdom in Andoni Local Government Area of Rivers State which showcase the rich cultural heritage of the Obolo peopleple as the most creative and prosperous fishing communities in Niger Delta and Nigeria.  

Ijok-Irin is literally interpreted as "fish feast", marks the end of traditional fishing season of the Obolo people between the months of July and August.

Historical background 

The origin of the festival is traced to existence of the people. Obolo people occupied the longest stretch of the Niger Delta coastal area, they are  predominantly fishermen and are widely spread across the Gulf of Guinea  . 

Unyeada people are mostly migrant fishermen who embark on fishing expedition to the length and breath of the African largest Delta; the Niger Delta, during each fishing season and must return home at the expiration of the season. It's traditionally required of every fishermen to bring with them their biggest catch to celebrate the festival. Before the advent of Christianity, It was regarded as a taboo in Obolo tradition for a fisherman to solely eat or sells his biggest catch. 

Fisherman with the biggest catch in the Kingdom receives an award and blessing from the King (Okaan Ama) and elders of the land with a traditional the title of "Ogu-isi-mbom", (King of Fish). The royal blessing, is believed to attract bounty harvest in the next fishing season. Another inportant  part of the festival is the sharing of a sacred feast called "Ogo" which is usually prepared by certain octogenarian women known as "Ugane-Ukuru-ekwet", the meal is madeup of local salad with smoked fish (preferably of ￼￼Barracuda specie) which is served with locally refined gin among the chiefs and elders of each lineages (Ibirinya) of the Kingdom. 

Obolo savory culinary culture is adjudged the best in Rivers State. Most delicacies here are essentially made from freshly caught organic Seafood (crab, prewinkcle, shrimp, cockle etc.) abound in the marine environment of Niger Delta. A Nigerian cuisine known as Native soup (Adaijong) originated from Andoni Local Government Area of Rivers State.

The festival which is week-long event culminated with the beating of the "Akama", a historic African war drum on every 5th of July. The Akama traditional drum has now becomes the symbol of unity Unyeada Kingdom. It is believed that when the Akama is beaten, it's awaken spirit of ancestors of the ancient Kingdom. 

In 1930, it was recorded by M. D. W Jeffreys, (Colonial administrator who later became an ethnographer) in his Intelligence report on the Andoni tribe, that the Andoni drum-lore (Akama) resonate the praise and remembrance of the 17th century BC Andoni King (Okan-Obolo), King Otuo Ogbalakon of Unyeada Kingdom. Saying as: "Otuo Ogbolakon, the great and famous warrior, when you get your enemy, hold him fast". 

The "Ijimangi", is a spectacular procession of Unyeada warriors of different age group usually dressed in traditional george wrapper  forming a colorful. parades showcasing the Cultural heritage of Unyeada Kingdom on the street of Unyeada Town, the ancestral Headquarters of the kingdom which usually attract admiration from visitors and tourists. This procession marked the end of the Ijok-Irin and signal the  beginning of the new fishing season. Other activities which precede Ijimangi include; "Uji-edonti" (Canoe regatta) each from the five ancestral lineages (Ibirinya) or from a major War canoe house (Egwe) in Unyeada Kingdom. The regatta commences from Iburubu Sea and ends at "Okwan-Ebu" (Imo River), each of the about 72 settlements that madeup the kingdom will receive the regatta with two bottles of local gin.  

The "Ogbo-njiin" is a choreographed fishing competition by net casting fishermen who cast their net not necessarily for the biggest catch but to showcase strength and mastery for skills in the fishing expedition. This part of the festival usually attract both local and foreign tourists and culture enthusiasts to Unyeada Kingdom.

Other events include a swimming competition, the "Miss Ijok-Irin Beauty Pageant" and an art exhibition.

Unyeada Fishing Festival in recent times, had been rebranded in line with the program of Rivers State Tourism Development Agency to promote cultural and ecotourism in Rivers State. In 2016, the festival was endorsed by the Government of Rivers State and was flagged off by Governor of Rivers State, Chief Barr Nyesom Wike CON, through the Commissioner, Rivers State Ministry of Agriculture Barr. Onimim Jacks.

List of Towns and Villages in Unyeada Kingdom 

Unyeada Town 
Inyongnchicha 
Amaekpu 
Galilee 
Mmunama 
Ama-Paul 
Ama-Utono 
Polokiri 
Iboronakama
Isiodum Town 
Ofunkrika 
Okwanjijor 
Otuokponuka 
Okolomudum
Egbormung Town 
Olukama 
Ajarikiri
Holy City
Agbadam 
Ama-Gabriel
Mbata
Oru
Ogboedim
Orunaja
Okukpo 
Otosot
Otuokoloikolo
Dema City 
Otuafa 
Otunria 
Ogbonte 
Ebon-Akpon 
Ibot-irem Town 
Isi-obiama 
Inyonoro
Okuka
Aso-Nlokibot
Ama-mbop 
Samanga Town 
Ajakajak Town 
Afaradigi 
Udungama Iyo
Okwan-york 
Nkanlek 
Mbaijon
Nkaku
Agbakoroma 
Otuafa

Notable people 
 King Otuo Ogbalakon, 17th Century Obolo (Andoni) King-Warrior, Unye-Obolo II
 Ezekiel Warigbani, Politician and Youth Activist 
 Sam Sam Etetegwung, Politician and Former MP/Secretary, APC Rivers State 
 Festus Elleh, US based computer analyst 
 Silas Eneyo, Medical doctor and Former Commissioner, Rivers State Ministry of Health 
 Gomiluk Otokwala, Senior Counsel to International Monetary Fund

See also
 Obolo people

References

Geography of Nigeria